André Krul (born 8 May 1987) is a Dutch professional footballer who plays as a goalkeeper for Glacis United. Besides the Netherlands, he has played in Colombia, Puerto Rico, Belgium, Japan, and Australia.

Club career

Youth
Born in Grootschermer, Krul started his career playing in AZ Alkmaar, AFC '34 and FC Utrecht's youth teams.

Utrecht and loans
Krul signed a professional contract with FC Utrecht in 2008, but made no appearance all the season. Krul was loaned to Eerste Divisie club SC Telstar for the 2009–10 season. He debuted in the 2–2 draw against SBV Excelsior. He made a total of 19 appearances in the season.

Krul returned to FC Utrecht in 2010. He was called in July 2010 for two UEFA Europa League matches, against Albanian club KF Tirana, but he remained on the bench. In August 2010, he was loaned to Sparta Rotterdam, where he made a total of 21 appearances.

For the 2011–12 season, Krul was loaned to Eerste Divisie club AGOVV Apeldoorn.

Abroad in Malta, Colombia and Belgium
After a season with the club, Krul was sold to Maltese club Valletta F.C., where he made four appearances in the UEFA Champions League, two matches against the Andorran club FC Lusitanos and the Serbian club FK Partizan.

With only a month in the club, Krul was sold to Colombian club Boyacá Chico. Krul debuted on 27 September 2012 in the 0–1 win against Millonarios.

He remained at the club until January 2014 when he was sold to Deportivo Pasto.

On 11 February 2014, AFC '34 announced André Krul as the new goalkeeper coach, after Bob Beentjes left the team. Having left Deportivo Pasto on 28 February, Krul accepted an offer from FC Groningen in March despite offers from Puerto Rican club Bayamón FC and Spanish club Arroyo. After signing with Groningen he stepped down as goalkeeper coach at AFC '34 with Beentjes returning in June.

Krul accepted a new offer of Bayamón in June 2014.

Return to the Netherlands
On 13 March 2021, he agreed to join Katwijk in the third-tier Tweede Divisie for the 2021–22 season.

Career statistics

References

External links
 
 André Krul at Voetbal International 

1987 births
Living people
People from Schermer
Sportspeople from Alkmaar
Dutch footballers
Association football goalkeepers
AZ Alkmaar players
FC Utrecht players
SC Telstar players
Sparta Rotterdam players
AGOVV Apeldoorn players
Valletta F.C. players
Boyacá Chicó F.C. footballers
FC Groningen players
Bayamón FC players
KFC Turnhout players
SC Cambuur players
Iwaki FC players
SV Spakenburg players
Preston Lions FC players
Jong Ajax players
Alemannia Aachen players
VV Katwijk players
Eredivisie players
Eerste Divisie players
Categoría Primera A players
Maltese Premier League players
Tweede Divisie players
Dutch expatriate footballers
Dutch expatriate sportspeople in Colombia
Dutch expatriate sportspeople in Malta
Dutch expatriate sportspeople in Belgium
Dutch expatriate sportspeople in Japan
Dutch expatriate sportspeople in Australia
Dutch expatriate sportspeople in Germany
Expatriate footballers in Colombia
Expatriate footballers in Malta
Expatriate footballers in Puerto Rico
Expatriate footballers in Belgium
Expatriate footballers in Japan
Expatriate soccer players in Australia
Expatriate footballers in Germany
Netherlands under-21 international footballers
AFC '34 players
Footballers from North Holland